The 2021 KBO League season, also known by naming rights sponsorship as 2021 Shinhan Bank SOL KBO League, was the 40th season in the history of the KBO League. 

At the conclusion of the regular season, all five playoff positions were undecided going into the final day of the schedule. The Samsung Lions and KT Wiz met in a tiebreaker game to decide the regular season champion, the first such game since 1985. The NC Dinos became the first defending champion to miss the playoffs since the Kia Tigers in 2010, while the Doosan Bears qualified for the seventh consecutive year. In the postseason, the Korean Series was won by KT Wiz, who defeated the Doosan Bears who had advanced the championship series as a wild card.

2021 also marked the first KBO season for the SSG Landers, formerly known as the SK Wyverns.

Season format
The KBO is a 10-team league. Each team plays 144 games, facing the other nine teams 16 times apiece. Games are declared ties after 12 innings (15 in the postseason), and those contests have no bearing on a team’s winning percentage. Five teams make the playoffs, where the league uses a step-ladder format; the fifth- and fourth-placed teams battle in a Wild Card round, the winner faces the three seed, and so on. Teams are limited to three foreign players each. Only two such players are allowed in the lineup at any one time, so teams generally roster two pitchers and one position player.

Standings

*Samsung Lions hosted tiebreaker game by virtue of head-to-head record with KT Wiz (9-6-1)

**KT Wiz won against Samsung Lions 1-0 in the tiebreaker game

Postseason

Wild Card
The series started with a 1–0 advantage for the fourth-placed team.

Semi-playoff

Playoff

Korean Series

See also
2021 in baseball
2021 Major League Baseball season
2021 Nippon Professional Baseball season

References

KBO League seasons
KBO League season
KBO League season
Korea Baseball Organization League, 2021